AR Yusuf Bangladeshi politician who was a minister.

Political life 
AR Yusuf was the Minister of Law, Justice and Parliamentary Affairs of Bangladesh from 19 January 1985 to 18 February 1985. He was the Minister of Civil Aviation and Tourism of Bangladesh from 19 January 1985 to 11 October 1985.

References 

Civil Aviation and Tourism ministers of Bangladesh
Law, Justice and Parliamentary Affairs ministers of Bangladesh
Jatiya Party politicians